Robert Liborio Zambito is a politician in Montreal, Quebec, Canada. He was a municipal councilor, most recently serving on
Montreal city council representing Saint-Léonard-Est as a member of the Union Montreal party between 2009 and 2013.

Early life and private career
Zambito was born in Italy. He was a land surveyor in the 1980s and was described as president of Ciment National Inc. and Entreprises de construction Stertalco Inc. in 1986. He later worked as a travel-agency operator and real-estate broker.

Early political career
Zambito was a Progressive Conservative Party of Quebec candidate in the 1985 provincial election, running in the Montreal division of Dorion. He focused his campaign on subsidized housing, community services for the elderly, and improved services at the city's Jean Talon Hospital. The Progressive Conservatives did not have a strong provincial base in Quebec, and Zambito finished fourth against Liberal Violette Trépanier on election day.

Zambito was narrowly elected to the Saint-Leonard city council in the 1986 municipal election, winning as a Ralliement de Saint-Léonard (RdSL) candidate in the city's twelfth ward. The RdSL won a majority on council, and Zambito initially supported mayor Raymond Renaud. In May 1988, Zambito and seven other councillors, led by Frank Zampino, charged that Renaud's administration was undemocratic and resigned from the party to sit as independents.

Frank Zampino later consolidated the rebel group as the Parti municipal and was elected as Saint-Leonard's mayor in the 1990 municipal election. Zambito was re-elected to council as a Parti municipal candidate in 1990, 1994 and 1998.

Post-amalgamation
All municipalities on the Island of Montreal were amalgamated into a single government in 2001, and Saint-Leonard became part of the new city of Montreal. Zambito was elected to the Saint-Leonard borough council in the 2001 municipal election as a candidate of the Montreal Island Citizens Union, which was later renamed as Union Montreal. He was re-elected in 2005 and was elected to a seat on the Montreal city council in the 2009 municipal election.

In 2003 Zambito was up for re-election in St-Leonard and  joined newly formed political party Equipe Coderre after his former party Union Montreal, under the former Mayor Gerald Tremblay, applied for dissolution after several raids were conducted by Montreal's anti-corruption squad (UPAC) and an investigation by the Charbonneau Commission.

Denis Coderre, mayoral candidate and party leader, removed Zambito from his party after Radio-Canada's investigative program Enquête, was planning to report that he had profited from a land deal by taking advantage of his position on council. Amidst allegations of a kick-back scheme Zambito dropped out of politics and is now working as a real-estate broker for Keller-Williams.

Italian politics
Zambito ran for the Italian Senate in that country's 2006 general election, as a candidate of Silvio Berlusconi's Forza Italia party in an overseas Senate division reserved for Italian voters in North America and Central America. He appeared on the ballot as "Liborio Zambito." Berlusconi's list was defeated by Romano Prodi's coalition, known as The Union.

Zambito subsequently broke with Berlusconi's party and sought election to the Italian Chamber of Deputies in the 2013 Italian general election as a candidate of Mario Monti's With Monti for Italy coalition. Although Monti's list received enough votes for one regional seat, Zambito did not place first in the list's candidate preference votes and was once again not elected.

Electoral record
Montreal municipal

Quebec provincial

Italian

References

External links
Union Montreal biography

Living people
Canadian people of Italian descent
Montreal city councillors
People from Saint-Leonard, Quebec
Year of birth missing (living people)